Surprise Sock is a 1978 French comedy film directed by Jean-François Davy and starring Anna Karina.

Cast
 Bernadette Lafont – Bernadette
 Anna Karina – Nathalie
 Christine Pascal – Juliette
 Rufus – Antoine
 Michel Galabru – L'obsédé de la télévision
 Bernard Haller – Bernard
 Bernard Le Coq – Raphaël
 Claude Piéplu – Doctor
 Agnès Soral – Charlotte
 Marcel Dalio – Monsieur L'église
 Henri Guybet – Assistant
 Micha Bayard – Nurse
 Didier Sauvegrain – Luc
 Jean-Claude Carrière – Fournier
 Lucien Jeunesse – L'animateur du jeu TV

References

External links

1978 films
1978 comedy films
French comedy films
1970s French-language films
Films directed by Jean-François Davy
1970s French films